Wang Huaixiang (1920 – February 23, 2013) was a Chinese general and politician. He was born in Taitou, Shandong (part of Shouguang). He was the chairman of the Revolutionary Committee (i.e., governor) of Jilin. He was a delegate to the 4th National People's Congress and a member of the 9th Central Committee of the Chinese Communist Party and 10th Central Committee of the Chinese Communist Party.

A beneficiary of the Cultural Revolution, Wang was quarantined for investigation in December 1977, and expelled from the Communist Party in February 1985. 

People's Republic of China politicians from Shandong
Chinese Communist Party politicians from Shandong
Governors of Jilin
Delegates to the 4th National People's Congress
Members of the 9th Central Committee of the Chinese Communist Party
Members of the 10th Central Committee of the Chinese Communist Party

1920 births
2013 deaths